Peter Sheppard Skærved (born 1966) Violinist and violist, is the dedicatee of over 150 new works.  He has collaborated with Nigel Clarke, David Matthews, Michael Finnissy, Hans Werner Henze, George Rochberg, William Bolcom, Dmitri Smirnov, Jörg Widmann and John Wall. He leads the Kreutzer Quartet, and has cultivated duo-partnerships with pianists including Aaron Shorr, Jan Philip Schulze, Daniel-Ben Pienaar and David Owen Norris, and the fortepianist and harpsichordist Julian Perkins.

References

External links

Peter Sheppard Skærved biography and discography at Naxos.com

British violinists
British male violinists
Living people
1966 births
21st-century violinists
21st-century British male musicians